Anatomical Sciences Education is a peer-reviewed journal that provides an international forum for the exchange of ideas, opinions, innovations and research on topics related to education in the anatomical sciences of gross anatomy, embryology, histology, and neurosciences at all levels of anatomical sciences education including, undergraduate, graduate, post-graduate, allied health, medical (both allopathic and osteopathic), and dental. It is the official publication of the American Association of Anatomists.

According to the Journal Citation Reports, the journal has a 2020 impact factor of 5.958, ranking it 3rd out of 45 journals in the category "Education, Scientific Disciplines".

References

External links 
 
 American Association for Anatomy
 PubMed Journal Info Page

Wiley (publisher) academic journals
Publications established in 2007
English-language journals
Anatomy journals